Ozerki or Ozyorki is the name of several  rural localities in Russia.

Modern localities

Altai Krai
As of 2010, four rural localities in Altai Krai bear this name:
Ozerki, Charyshsky District, Altai Krai, a selo in Alekseyevsky Selsoviet of Charyshsky District
Ozerki, Shipunovsky District, Altai Krai, a settlement in Yeltsovsky Selsoviet of Shipunovsky District
Ozyorki, Novoozersky Selsoviet, Talmensky District, Altai Krai, a station in Novoozersky Selsoviet of Talmensky District
Ozyorki, Ozersky Selsoviet, Talmensky District, Altai Krai, a selo in Ozersky Selsoviet of Talmensky District

Republic of Bashkortostan
As of 2010, three rural localities in the Republic of Bashkortostan bear this name:
Ozerki, Karaidelsky District, Republic of Bashkortostan, a village in Ozerkinsky Selsoviet of Karaidelsky District
Ozerki, Meleuzovsky District, Republic of Bashkortostan, a village in Shevchenkovsky Selsoviet of Meleuzovsky District
Ozerki, Mishkinsky District, Republic of Bashkortostan, a village in Staroarzamatovsky Selsoviet of Mishkinsky District

Belgorod Oblast
As of 2010, one rural locality in Belgorod Oblast bears this name:
Ozerki, Belgorod Oblast, a selo in Starooskolsky District

Kaliningrad Oblast
As of 2010, three rural localities in Kaliningrad Oblast bear this name:
Ozerki, Gvardeysky District, Kaliningrad Oblast, a settlement in Ozerkovsky Rural Okrug of Gvardeysky District
Ozerki, Nesterovsky District, Kaliningrad Oblast, a settlement in Chistoprudnensky Rural Okrug of Nesterovsky District
Ozerki, Pravdinsky District, Kaliningrad Oblast, a settlement under the administrative jurisdiction of the urban-type settlement of district significance of  Zheleznodorozhny, Pravdinsky District

Kaluga Oblast
As of 2010, one rural locality in Kaluga Oblast bears this name:
Ozerki, Kaluga Oblast, a village in Yukhnovsky District

Kemerovo Oblast
As of 2010, one rural locality in Kemerovo Oblast bears this name:
Ozerki, Kemerovo Oblast, a village in Padunskaya Rural Territory of Promyshlennovsky District

Kirov Oblast
As of 2010, one rural locality in Kirov Oblast bears this name:
Ozerki, Kirov Oblast, a village in Podgorodny Rural Okrug of Orlovsky District

Kostroma Oblast
As of 2010, one rural locality in Kostroma Oblast bears this name:
Ozerki, Kostroma Oblast, a village in Chukhlomskoye Settlement of Chukhlomsky District

Kurgan Oblast
As of 2010, one rural locality in Kurgan Oblast bears this name:
Ozerki, Kurgan Oblast, a village in Korovinsky Selsoviet of Mishkinsky District

Kursk Oblast
As of 2010, seven rural localities in Kursk Oblast bear this name:
Ozerki, Belovsky District, Kursk Oblast, a selo in Ozerkovsky Selsoviet of Belovsky District
Ozerki, Fatezhsky District, Kursk Oblast, a village in Verkhnekhotemlsky Selsoviet of Fatezhsky District
Ozerki, Kastorensky District, Kursk Oblast, a village in Azarovsky Selsoviet of Kastorensky District
Ozerki, Oktyabrsky District, Kursk Oblast, a village in Artyukhovsky Selsoviet of Oktyabrsky District
Ozerki, Pristensky District, Kursk Oblast, a khutor in Kolbasovsky Selsoviet of Pristensky District
Ozerki, Shchigrovsky District, Kursk Oblast, a village in Ozersky Selsoviet of Shchigrovsky District
Ozerki, Zheleznogorsky District, Kursk Oblast, a settlement in Volkovsky Selsoviet of Zheleznogorsky District

Leningrad Oblast
As of 2010, three rural localities in Leningrad Oblast bear this name:
Ozerki, Vsevolozhsky District, Leningrad Oblast, a village in Razmetelevskoye Settlement Municipal Formation of Vsevolozhsky District
Ozerki, Pervomayskoye Settlement Municipal Formation, Vyborgsky District, Leningrad Oblast, a logging depot settlement in Pervomayskoye Settlement Municipal Formation of Vyborgsky District
Ozerki, Primorskoye Settlement Municipal Formation, Vyborgsky District, Leningrad Oblast, a logging depot settlement under the administrative jurisdiction of Primorskoye Settlement Municipal Formation of Vyborgsky District

Lipetsk Oblast
As of 2010, six rural localities in Lipetsk Oblast bear this name:
Ozerki, Dolgorukovsky District, Lipetsk Oblast, a village in Zhernovsky Selsoviet of Dolgorukovsky District
Ozerki, Lev-Tolstovsky District, Lipetsk Oblast, a village in Novochemodanovsky Selsoviet of Lev-Tolstovsky District
Ozerki, Ognevsky Selsoviet, Stanovlyansky District, Lipetsk Oblast, a village in Ognevsky Selsoviet of Stanovlyansky District
Ozerki, Petrishchevsky Selsoviet, Stanovlyansky District, Lipetsk Oblast, a village in Petrishchevsky Selsoviet of Stanovlyansky District
Ozerki, Terbunsky District, Lipetsk Oblast, a selo in Ozersky Selsoviet of Terbunsky District
Ozerki, Usmansky District, Lipetsk Oblast, a village in Bereznyagovsky Selsoviet of Usmansky District

Mari El Republic
As of 2010, three rural localities in the Mari El Republic bear this name:
Ozerki, Gornomariysky District, Mari El Republic, a village in Ozerkinsky Rural Okrug of Gornomariysky District
Ozerki, Kilemarsky District, Mari El Republic, a village in Ardinsky Rural Okrug of Kilemarsky District
Ozerki, Zvenigovsky District, Mari El Republic, a village under the administrative jurisdiction of the urban-type settlement of Krasnogorsky, Zvenigovsky District

Republic of Mordovia
As of 2010, two rural localities in the Republic of Mordovia bear this name:
Ozerki, Atyuryevsky District, Republic of Mordovia, a settlement in Dmitriyevo-Usadsky Selsoviet of Atyuryevsky District
Ozerki, Ruzayevsky District, Republic of Mordovia, a village in Palayevsky Selsoviet of Ruzayevsky District

Moscow Oblast
As of 2010, two rural localities in Moscow Oblast bear this name:
Ozerki, Serebryano-Prudsky District, Moscow Oblast, a village in Mochilskoye Rural Settlement of Serebryano-Prudsky District
Ozerki, Zaraysky District, Moscow Oblast, a village in Strupnenskoye Rural Settlement of Zaraysky District

Nizhny Novgorod Oblast
As of 2010, seven rural localities in Nizhny Novgorod Oblast bear this name:
Ozerki, Bor, Nizhny Novgorod Oblast, a village in Krasnoslobodsky Selsoviet of the city of oblast significance of Bor
Ozerki, Semyonov, Nizhny Novgorod Oblast, a village in Bokovskoy Selsoviet of the city of oblast significance of Semyonov
Ozerki, Arzamassky District, Nizhny Novgorod Oblast, a village in Berezovsky Selsoviet of Arzamassky District
Ozerki, Knyagininsky District, Nizhny Novgorod Oblast, a village in Vozrozhdensky Selsoviet of Knyagininsky District
Ozerki, Pilninsky District, Nizhny Novgorod Oblast, a selo in Yazykovsky Selsoviet of Pilninsky District
Ozerki, Shatkovsky District, Nizhny Novgorod Oblast, a selo in Krasnoborsky Selsoviet of Shatkovsky District
Ozerki, Sosnovsky District, Nizhny Novgorod Oblast, a village in Paninsky Selsoviet of Sosnovsky District

Novgorod Oblast
As of 2010, four rural localities in Novgorod Oblast bear this name:
Ozerki, Novorakhinskoye Settlement, Krestetsky District, Novgorod Oblast, a village in Novorakhinskoye Settlement of Krestetsky District
Ozerki, Zaytsevskoye Settlement, Krestetsky District, Novgorod Oblast, a village in Zaytsevskoye Settlement of Krestetsky District
Ozerki, Okulovsky District, Novgorod Oblast, a village under the administrative jurisdiction of the urban-type settlement of Uglovka, Okulovsky District
Ozerki, Poddorsky District, Novgorod Oblast, a village in Poddorskoye Settlement of Poddorsky District

Novosibirsk Oblast
As of 2010, one rural locality in Novosibirsk Oblast bears this name:
Ozerki, Novosibirsk Oblast, a settlement in Iskitimsky District

Orenburg Oblast
As of 2010, two rural localities in Orenburg Oblast bear this name:
Ozerki, Ileksky District, Orenburg Oblast, a selo in Ozersky Selsoviet of Ileksky District
Ozerki, Kurmanayevsky District, Orenburg Oblast, a selo in Labazinsky Selsoviet of Kurmanayevsky District

Oryol Oblast
As of 2010, six rural localities in Oryol Oblast bear this name:
Ozerki, Dmitrovsky District, Oryol Oblast, a settlement in Dolbenkinsky Selsoviet of Dmitrovsky District
Ozerki, Dolzhansky District, Oryol Oblast, a village in Uspensky Selsoviet of Dolzhansky District
Ozerki, Glazunovsky District, Oryol Oblast, a village in Senkovsky Selsoviet of Glazunovsky District
Ozerki, Orlovsky District, Oryol Oblast, a settlement in Pakhomovsky Selsoviet of Orlovsky District
Ozerki, Sverdlovsky District, Oryol Oblast, a village in Novopetrovsky Selsoviet of Sverdlovsky District
Ozerki, Verkhovsky District, Oryol Oblast, a village in Galichinsky Selsoviet of Verkhovsky District

Penza Oblast
As of 2010, four rural localities in Penza Oblast bear this name:
Ozerki, Belinsky District, Penza Oblast, a village in Kozlovsky Selsoviet of Belinsky District
Ozerki, Mokshansky District, Penza Oblast, a selo in Podgornensky Selsoviet of Mokshansky District
Ozerki, Sosnovoborsky District, Penza Oblast, a selo in Nikolo-Barnukovsky Selsoviet of Sosnovoborsky District
Ozerki, Tamalinsky District, Penza Oblast, a village in Ulyanovsky Selsoviet of Tamalinsky District

Perm Krai
As of 2010, one rural locality in Perm Krai bears this name:
Ozerki, Perm Krai, a village in Oktyabrsky District

Pskov Oblast
As of 2010, two rural localities in Pskov Oblast bear this name:
Ozerki, Gdovsky District, Pskov Oblast, a village in Gdovsky District
Ozerki, Loknyansky District, Pskov Oblast, a village in Loknyansky District

Rostov Oblast
As of 2010, one rural locality in Rostov Oblast bears this name:
Ozerki, Rostov Oblast, a khutor in Krasnoluchskoye Rural Settlement of Oktyabrsky District

Ryazan Oblast
As of 2010, five rural localities in Ryazan Oblast bear this name:
Ozerki, Kasimovsky District, Ryazan Oblast, a village in Giblitsky Rural Okrug of Kasimovsky District
Ozerki, Klepikovsky District, Ryazan Oblast, a village in Bychkovsky Rural Okrug of Klepikovsky District
Ozerki, Miloslavsky District, Ryazan Oblast, a selo in Bogoroditsky Rural Okrug of Miloslavsky District
Ozerki, Pronsky District, Ryazan Oblast, a settlement in Alyutovsky Rural Okrug of Pronsky District
Ozerki, Sarayevsky District, Ryazan Oblast, a selo in Ozerkovsky Rural Okrug of Sarayevsky District

Samara Oblast
As of 2010, two rural localities in Samara Oblast bear this name:
Ozerki, Chelno-Vershinsky District, Samara Oblast, a selo in Chelno-Vershinsky District
Ozerki, Volzhsky District, Samara Oblast, a settlement in Volzhsky District

Saratov Oblast
As of 2010, four rural localities in Saratov Oblast bear this name:
Ozerki, Dukhovnitsky District, Saratov Oblast, a selo in Dukhovnitsky District
Ozerki, Kalininsky District, Saratov Oblast, a selo in Kalininsky District
Ozerki, Lysogorsky District, Saratov Oblast, a selo in Lysogorsky District
Ozerki, Petrovsky District, Saratov Oblast, a selo in Petrovsky District

Stavropol Krai
As of 2010, one rural locality in Stavropol Krai bears this name:
Ozerki, Stavropol Krai, a settlement in Medvezhensky Selsoviet of Krasnogvardeysky District

Sverdlovsk Oblast
As of 2010, two rural localities in Sverdlovsk Oblast bear this name:
Ozerki, Krasnoufimsky District, Sverdlovsk Oblast, a village in Krasnoufimsky District
Ozerki, Taborinsky District, Sverdlovsk Oblast, a village in Taborinsky District

Tambov Oblast
As of 2015, five rural localities in Tambov Oblast bear this name:
Ozerki, Michurinsky District, Tambov Oblast, a village in Starokazinsky Selsoviet of Michurinsky District
Ozerki, Nikiforovsky District, Tambov Oblast, a selo in Ozersky Selsoviet of Nikiforovsky District
Ozerki, Pervomaysky District, Tambov Oblast, a village in Staroklensky Selsoviet of Pervomaysky District
Ozerki, Petrovsky District, Tambov Oblast, a selo in Shekhmansky Selsoviet of Petrovsky District
Ozerki, Tambovsky District, Tambov Oblast, a village in Novoseltsevsky Selsoviet of Tambovsky District

Tula Oblast
As of 2010, five rural localities in Tula Oblast bear this name:
Ozerki, Kireyevsky District, Tula Oblast, a village in Bolshekalmyksky Rural Okrug of Kireyevsky District
Ozerki, Kurkinsky District, Tula Oblast, a village in Krestovskaya Volost of Kurkinsky District
Ozerki, Novomoskovsky District, Tula Oblast, a village in Ozerkovsky Rural Okrug of Novomoskovsky District
Ozerki, Tyoplo-Ogaryovsky District, Tula Oblast, a village in Lidinsky Rural Okrug of Tyoplo-Ogaryovsky District
Ozerki, Yefremovsky District, Tula Oblast, a village in Yaroslavsky Rural Okrug of Yefremovsky District

Tver Oblast
As of 2010, four rural localities in Tver Oblast bear this name:
Ozerki, Konakovsky District, Tver Oblast, a settlement in Konakovsky District
Ozerki, Ostashkovsky District, Tver Oblast, a village in Ostashkovsky District
Ozerki, Sonkovsky District, Tver Oblast, a village in Sonkovsky District
Ozerki, Zapadnodvinsky District, Tver Oblast, a settlement in Zapadnodvinsky District

Tyumen Oblast
As of 2010, one rural locality in Tyumen Oblast bears this name:
Ozerki, Tyumen Oblast, a settlement in Zavodoukovsky District

Udmurt Republic
As of 2010, one rural locality in the Udmurt Republic bears this name:
Ozerki, Udmurt Republic, a village in Kazakovsky Selsoviet of Yarsky District

Ulyanovsk Oblast
As of 2010, three rural localities in Ulyanovsk Oblast bear this name:
Ozerki, Cherdaklinsky District, Ulyanovsk Oblast, a selo in Ozersky Rural Okrug of Cherdaklinsky District
Ozerki, Kuzovatovsky District, Ulyanovsk Oblast, a selo in Bezvodovsky Rural Okrug of Kuzovatovsky District
Ozerki, Veshkaymsky District, Ulyanovsk Oblast, a selo under the administrative jurisdiction of Veshkaymsky Settlement Okrug of Veshkaymsky District

Vladimir Oblast
As of 2010, one rural locality in Vladimir Oblast bears this name:
Ozerki, Vladimir Oblast, a village in Vyaznikovsky District

Volgograd Oblast
As of 2010, two rural localities in Volgograd Oblast bear this name:
Ozerki, Ilovlinsky District, Volgograd Oblast, a khutor in Ozersky Selsoviet of Ilovlinsky District
Ozerki, Kikvidzensky District, Volgograd Oblast, a khutor in Ozerkinsky Selsoviet of Kikvidzensky District

Vologda Oblast
As of 2010, three rural localities in Vologda Oblast bear this name:
Ozerki (settlement), Dmitriyevsky Selsoviet, Nyuksensky District, Vologda Oblast, a settlement in Dmitriyevsky Selsoviet of Nyuksensky District
Ozerki (village), Dmitriyevsky Selsoviet, Nyuksensky District, Vologda Oblast, a village in Dmitriyevsky Selsoviet of Nyuksensky District
Ozerki, Vytegorsky District, Vologda Oblast, a village in Ankhimovsky Selsoviet of Vytegorsky District

Voronezh Oblast
As of 2010, one rural locality in Voronezh Oblast bears this name:
Ozerki, Voronezh Oblast, a selo in Ozerskoye Rural Settlement of Buturlinovsky District

Yaroslavl Oblast
As of 2010, three rural localities in Yaroslavl Oblast bear this name:
Ozerki (selo), Seredskoy Rural Okrug, Danilovsky District, Yaroslavl Oblast, a selo in Seredskoy Rural Okrug of Danilovsky District
Ozerki (village), Seredskoy Rural Okrug, Danilovsky District, Yaroslavl Oblast, a village in Seredskoy Rural Okrug of Danilovsky District
Ozerki, Yaroslavsky District, Yaroslavl Oblast, a village in Tolbukhinsky Rural Okrug of Yaroslavsky District

Abolished localities
Ozerki, Gavrilovsky District, Tambov Oblast, a former settlement in Bulgakovsky Selsoviet of Gavrilovsky District in Tambov Oblast; abolished in March 2015

See also
Malye Ozerki